South Suburban Conference can refer to one of the following:
South Suburban Junior High School Conference (Illinois), a middle school sports conference in Illinois
South Suburban Conference (Illinois), a high school sports conference in Illinois
South Suburban Conference (Minnesota), a high school sports conference in Minnesota
South Suburban Conference (Georgia), a high school sports conference in Georgia